"Shooting Star" is a song by American electronica project Owl City from his second extended play Shooting Star. The song premiered exclusively via Billboard on May 10, 2012 before it was released as the lead single from the EP on May 15, 2012. The song peaked at No. 176 on the UK Singles Chart and No. 49 on the Japan Hot 100. It was featured twice in the 2013 computer-animated film Escape from Planet Earth.

Background
Adam Young began to write "Shooting Star" in 2008 with Relient K's Matt Thiessen. The song was planned for inclusion on Owl City's Ocean Eyes album (2009), but it didn't make the cut. As work began on the album, The Midsummer Station (2012), Young brought a 90-second demo of the "old leftover instrumental idea" to Norwegian record producing and songwriting team Stargate, who helped complete the composition. Young recalled, "All the lyrics were basically written on the spot during those two days... and then I went back home to my own studio in Minnesota to cut the final (version). I think I tweaked some lyrics here and there to make everything feel better, and then the song was finished."

The song was originally intended to be the lead single from The Midsummer Station, but the success of Carly Rae Jepsen's "Call Me Maybe" led to Owl City's management choosing the duet "Good Time" instead. An acoustic version of the song was also released in 2013, on Owl City's The Midsummer Station - Acoustic EP.

Reception
"Shooting Star" peaked at No. 36 on the US Christian Songs chart, No. 49 on the Japan Hot 100 chart, and No. 176 on the UK Singles Chart. Scott Fryberger of Jesus Freak Hideout wrote that the song is "still poppy and very accessible, and Owl City fans will probably feel mostly at home, but it has a bit more of a dance music vibe than the synthpop we're used to." Tris McCall of The Star-Ledger called the song "the least successful thing" on The Midsummer Station. McCall added that "while Young can discharge a self-affirmatory verse with the conviction of a choirboy, the song does skirt a bit too close to Katy Perry territory for comfort." Dave Lewis of Uproxx called the track a "danceable, extremely upbeat and positive pop anthem."

Music video
On May 14, 2012, Owl City uploaded an official audio stream for "Shooting Star" to his official YouTube channel. The video features some type of fox or dog walking around in a city with orange fur.

Young posted screen-shots of the upcoming video on his Twitter account for Shooting Star prior to its release. The MTV website includes an interview with Young about the filming of the video.

On October 25, 2012, Owl City uploaded the official music video for "Shooting Star" to his official YouTube channel. The video's setting is nighttime in an urban area. The video features scenes of Young playing an electric piano under the street lights and people (who emit light from their chests) running, slowly gathering to all run together in the same direction.

Use in media
This song is featured in the 2013 3D animated film, Escape from Planet Earth, twice.

It is also featured in the third trailer of Epic, and in the 2015 Nickelodeon TV show, Bella and the Bulldogs.

Track listing

Charts

Weekly charts

Year-end charts

Release history

In popular culture 

The song was used in a flash mob that happened during an ice hockey game on February 10, 2013 as part of an annual anti-bullying campaign in British Columbia.

References

2012 singles
Owl City songs
Songs written by Tor Erik Hermansen
Songs written by Mikkel Storleer Eriksen
Songs written by Robopop
Song recordings produced by Stargate (record producers)
2012 songs
Songs written by Adam Young
Songs written by Matt Thiessen
Universal Republic Records singles